Arcadia is a small town in Victoria, Australia. It is on Kennedys Road, in the City of Greater Shepparton, south of Shepparton.

The local railway station on the Goulburn Valley line opened on 13 January 1880 and closed on 30 June 1977.

The Post Office opened on 24 November 1873, being replaced by Arcadia Railway Station office, which was renamed Arcadia around 1902 and closed in 1993.

References

External links

Towns in Victoria (Australia)
City of Greater Shepparton